Doffing is a census-designated place (CDP) in Hidalgo County, Texas. The population was 5,091 at the 2010 United States Census. It is part of the McAllen–Edinburg–Mission Metropolitan Statistical Area.

Geography
Doffing is located at  (26.273076, -98.384741).

Demographics
As of the census of 2000, there were 4,256 people, 915 households, and 871 families residing in the CDP. The population density was 982.0 people per square mile (379.5/km2). There were 1,024 housing units at an average density of 236.3/sq mi (91.3/km2). The racial makeup of the CDP was 34.35% White, 0.02% African American, 64.92% from other races, and 0.70% from two or more races. Hispanic or Latino of any race were 99.20% of the population.

There were 915 households, out of which 75.7% had children under the age of 18 living with them, 79.9% were married couples living together, 11.8% had a female householder with no husband present, and 4.8% were non-families. 4.3% of all households were made up of individuals, and 1.3% had someone living alone who was 65 years of age or older. The average household size was 4.65 and the average family size was 4.74.

In the CDP, the population was spread out, with 45.7% under the age of 18, 10.7% from 18 to 24, 30.4% from 25 to 44, 10.9% from 45 to 64, and 2.4% who were 65 years of age or older. The median age was 20 years. For every 100 females, there were 96.9 males. For every 100 females age 18 and over, there were 95.2 males.

The median income for a household in the CDP was $18,192, and the median income for a family was $19,353. Males had a median income of $15,017 versus $12,784 for females. The per capita income for the CDP was $4,923. About 43.0% of families and 42.5% of the population were below the poverty line, including 48.5% of those under age 18 and 26.8% of those age 65 or over.

Education
Doffing is served by the La Joya Independent School District. Zoned schools include:
 Elementary: Narciso Cavazos, E. R. Chapa, Henry B. González, and Patricio Perez
 Middle: Irene Garcia, A. Richards, and J. D. Salinas
 La Joya High School and Palmview High School

In addition, South Texas Independent School District operates magnet schools that serve the community.

References

Census-designated places in Hidalgo County, Texas
Census-designated places in Texas